A cleanup or clean-up is a form of environmental volunteering where a group of people get together to pick-up and dispose of litter in a designated location. Cleanups can take place on a street, in a neighborhood, at a park, on a water stream, or other public spaces. Cleanup events are often volunteer run. The cleanup volunteers make sure the waste picked-up is disposed of in its appropriate place. Cleanup events are often community-centered and led.  During the COVID 19 pandemic litter picking participation has greatly increased in the UK.    There are a vast range of reasons that people take part in litter picking activities. These include: clearing up unsightly areas; protecting wildlife; keeping people safe, connecting with nature, finding valuables, being part of a community, mental & physical health benefits and acting to protect the environment.

See also

 Volunteering
 Plogging
 Earth Day
 National CleanUp Day
 World Cleanup Day

External links
 Cleanups.org
 National CleanUp Day
 Plogging
 Trashtag

References

Environmental volunteering
Litter
Waste collection